James John Keane (August 26, 1857 – August 2, 1929) was an American prelate of the Roman Catholic Church.   He served as bishop of the Diocese of Cheyenne in Wyoming from 1902 to 1911, and then as archbishop of the Archdiocese of Dubuque in Iowa from 1911 until his death in 1929.

Biography

Early life 
James Keane was born August 26, 1857, in Joliet, Illinois.  When he was a young child, the family moved to Minnesota. He was educated at St. John's Seminary in Collegeville, Minnesota, St. Francis Xavier College in New York City and the Grand Séminaire de Montréal in Montreal, Quebec.

Priesthood 
Keane was ordained a priest in Montreal by Archbishop Édouard-Charles Fabre on December 23, 1882, for the Archdiocese of Saint Paul.  After his ordination, Keane was assigned as an assistant pastor in parishes within the archdiocese.  He soon became a faculty member of the College of St. Thomas in St. Paul, Minnesota.  Keane was named president of the college in 1882,  He left that position in 1892 to become pastor of Immaculate Conception parish in Minneapolis.

Bishop of Cheyenne 
On June 10, 1902 Pope Leo XIII appointed Keane as the third bishop of Diocese of Cheyenne. He was consecrated on October 28, 1902, by Archbishop John Ireland.  Bishops Joseph Cotter and James McGolrick were the principal co-consecrators.

Keane came to Wyoming at a time of increasing population and economic expansion.  Keane needed to recruit priests who would be willing to work in the difficult environment of Wyoming, and was successful in doing so.  The diocese was incorporated according to the laws of the state of Wyoming.  The parishes of the diocese were likewise incorporated with the bishop, the pastor and two lay trustees serving as a corporate board at each parish.   He was successful in his appeals to the newly formed Catholic Church Extension Society for funds to expand the church across the state.  He also directed the building of Cheyenne's St. Mary's Cathedral and a new episcopal residence.  The cathedral was dedicated in 1909.  He served the diocese as its bishop for nine years.

Archbishop of Dubuque 
Pope Pius X named James Keane as the third archbishop of the Archdiocese of Dubuque on August 11, 1911.  James Keane would gain the nickname "Hickory" due to his stern nature. Along with the Keane appointment, the pope created the new Diocese of Des Moines out of the western part of the archdiocese.

One of Keane's interests as archbishop was Columbia College in Dubuque. When he came to Dubuque, Columbia had an enrollment of 330 and a staff of 20. By the time he died, it had an enrollment of 700 and a faculty of 48. He began an endowment fund for the college in 1917, and it became one of only seven Catholic educational institutions in the U.S. with an endowment fund of at least one million dollars.  Keane secured a $200,000 donation from the Rockefeller Foundation for the college.  A strong believer in Catholic education, Keane insisted that all Catholics in the archdiocese support the parochial schools, even if they did not have children attending them. He also started the diocesan newspaper, the Witness.

Keane was a staunch supporter of the temperance movement in the United States and spoke out frequently against alcohol consumption.  He also served on the Irish Peace Commission of 1920, organized to resolve the armed conflict in Ireland between the United Kingdom and the Irish Republican Army. Keane gained national attention as a speaker at the 1926 World's Alliance for International Friendship, his address being broadcast nationally on radio. Keane decreed that Catholics who went out dancing on Saturday nights should be denied communion at Mass.

Death and legacy 
James Keane died on August 2, 1929, in Dubuque, Iowa.  He was buried at Mount Olivet Cemetery in Key West, Iowa.

Notes

External links 
 
 

1857 births
1929 deaths
20th-century Roman Catholic archbishops in the United States
Saint John's University School of Theology–Seminary alumni
University of St. Thomas (Minnesota) alumni
Roman Catholic Archdiocese of Saint Paul and Minneapolis
Roman Catholic bishops of Cheyenne
Roman Catholic archbishops of Dubuque
People from Joliet, Illinois
Burials in Iowa
Religious leaders from Minnesota
Catholics from Illinois